Charles Commander (Chuck) Clay (born December 23, 1950) is an American Republican politician from the state of Georgia. He was a member of the Georgia State Senate from the 37th district from 1989 to 1999 and again from 2003 to 2005. He served as Chair of the Georgia Republican Party from 1999 to 2001. He ran for Lieutenant Governor of Georgia in 1998, but came third in the primary. He ran for Georgia's 6th congressional district in 2004, but came third in the primary. He earned his BA from the University of North Carolina at Chapel Hill and his Juris Doctor degree from the University of Georgia School of Law. As of 2017, Hall Booth Smith, P.C. hired Clay as of counsel.

Clay is the grandson of General Lucius D. Clay.

References

External links 
 
 Profile at  Hall Booth Smith, P.C.
 Chuck Clay, Reflections on Georgia Politics November 2009
 Chuck Clay, Reflections on Georgia Politics December 2009
 Chuck Clay, Two-Party Georgia Oral History Project December 2017

|-

|-

|-

1950 births
20th-century American politicians
21st-century American politicians
Republican Party Georgia (U.S. state) state senators
Living people
University of Georgia School of Law alumni
University of North Carolina at Chapel Hill alumni